Nathalie Marchetti (born 10 September 1996) is a Belgian table tennis player. Her highest career ITTF ranking was 138.

Nathalie Marchetti is holding 4 woman single titles in Master Belgian National Championship (2013, 2014, 2015 and 2022).

References

1996 births
Living people
Belgian female table tennis players